Nana Aboagye Dacosta is a Ghanaian musician.

Biography
Born in 1957 to the late Opanyin Kojo Obiri Asamoah and Madam Nana Yaa Manu in the Ashanti Region, specifically Bantam, a suburb of Kumasi, and the second child among eight siblings, he played highlife tunes for years. His parents would not permit him to become a musician, so he started out his musical career in Amsterdam, Holland, where he was based for years as a songwriter, composing songs for other artistes.

As a promoter of artistes and producer in 1988, he helped promote artistes in Amsterdam, including the group Osofo Dadzie. In 1990, he self-produced and released his first album Abrabo, and his second album was released in 1992 titled Odo me ne wobeko. The songs "Feeling bam" and "Odo me ne wobeko" were his first commercially successful singles in Ghana and abroad.

The last song he released was in 2011, track titled "Wo be so Mama".

He returned to Ghana after several years abroad, and is currently the chairman of the newly constituted interim Ghana Music Right Organization (GHAMRO) board. He is also a timber merchant.

References

Ghanaian highlife musicians
Ghanaian record producers
1957 births
Living people
People from Kumasi